Phyllonorycter turcomanicella is a moth of the family Gracillariidae. It is known from Turkmenistan.

The larvae feed on Acer turcomanicum. They mine the leaves of their host plant.

References

turcomanicella
Moths of Asia
Moths described in 1956